Câmpineanca is a commune located in Vrancea County, Romania. It is composed of three villages: Câmpineanca, Pietroasa and Vâlcele.

References

Communes in Vrancea County
Localities in Muntenia